William Gisborne (13 August 1825 – 7 January 1898) was the first New Zealand Cabinet Secretary from 1864 to 1869, Colonial Secretary of New Zealand from 1869 to 1872, and Minister of Public Works between 1870 and 1871. The city of Gisborne in New Zealand is named after him.

Early life
Gisborne was born in 1825. He was the third son of Thomas John Gisborne (1789–1868) of Holme Hall, near Bakewell in Derbyshire, England. His mother was Sarah Gisborne (née Krehmer). His grandfather was Thomas Gisborne (1758–1846), who fought for the abolition of the slave trade in England. Thomas Gisborne the Younger (1790–1852) was an uncle who represented various constituencies in the House of Commons between 1830 and 1852. His eldest sister, Mary, married William Evans, who would later be made a baronet.

William Gisborne emigrated to Australia in 1842 and to New Zealand in 1847. He was initially secretary to Edward John Eyre, the lieutenant governor of New Munster Province. He was then appointed commissioner of Crown lands, a role for which he moved to New Zealand's capital, Auckland.

Gisborne returned to England for 1852 and 1853. Afterwards, he held various roles as a civil servant. He resigned from the civil service in 1869.

Gisborne married Caroline Gertrude Bridgen at St Mary's Church in the Auckland suburb of Parnell, and the couple had four children (one son, three daughters).

Political career

By 1863 Cabinet had largely taken over the function of the Colonial Executive Council. This led to the establishment of the Cabinet Secretary in 1864 with Gisborne being the first appointee in the role. He resigned from the position in 1869 and left the civil service to take on the role of Colonial Secretary in the third Fox Ministry. He was appointed to the New Zealand Legislative Council on 2 July 1869, and resigned on 11 January 1871. A week later, he was elected to the New Zealand Parliament in the 1871 general election for the Egmont electorate.  He resigned on 10 September 1872. In December 1875, Gisborne was a strong candidate for the Wellington mayoralty, but he fell out with the public over him favouring denominational education. In addition, he then announced himself as a candidate for the 1875 general election in the  electorate, and that triggered a concerted effort to find a suitable mayoral opponent. When Gisborne lost the mayoral election against William Hutchison, he withdraw from the general election.

Later life
He returned to England in 1881 following the death of his elder brother Francis. In 1892 he inherited Allestree Hall from his brother-in-law, Sir William Evans, 1st Baronet, and died there in 1898. His wife died in 1908. In 1870, the city of Gisborne in New Zealand was named after him. The township of Gisborne in Victoria, Australia, was named after Henry Fyshe Gisborne, who was a cousin of William Gisborne.

Notes

References

1825 births
1898 deaths
New Zealand public servants
Members of the Cabinet of New Zealand
Members of the New Zealand House of Representatives
Members of the New Zealand Legislative Council
New Zealand MPs for North Island electorates
19th-century New Zealand politicians
Colonial Secretaries of New Zealand
People from Allestree